Kelleythorpe is a hamlet in the East Riding of Yorkshire, England, it forms part of the civil parish of Kirkburn. It is situated in the Yorkshire Wolds on the A614 road near to its junction with the A164 road.

Kellythorpe Industrial Estate is at the north of the hamlet.

References

External links

Villages in the East Riding of Yorkshire